His Honour Judge Graham Boal KC (24 October 1943 – 30 December 2022) was a British judge and author. He wrote a book about his alcoholism. 

Graham Boal QC was a criminal barrister for thirty years before serving as a judge for nine years until his retirement as a Permanent Judge at London's Central Criminal Court, the Old Bailey, in 2005. The author is now a trustee and board member of WDP, a leading addiction charity.

References

1943 births
2022 deaths
British judges
British writers
Deaths from throat cancer